Scanlon is a city in Carlton County, Minnesota, United States. The population was 991 at the 2010 census.

Interstate 35 and Carlton County Highway 45 (CR 45) are two of the main routes in Scanlon.

Other main routes include Washington Avenue (CR 16) and County Road 61 (CR 61).

Scanlon is located immediately east of the city of Cloquet; and 18 miles southwest of the city of Duluth.

History
A post office called Scanlon was established in 1901, and remained in operation until it was discontinued in 1954. The city was named for Joseph Scanlon, a businessperson in the lumber industry.

Geography

The Saint Louis River flows through at the eastern edge of Scanlon.

Demographics

2010 census
As of the census of 2010, there were 991 people, 426 households, and 279 families living in the city. The racial makeup of the city was 92.1% White, 0.4% African American, 3.3% Native American, 1.1% Asian, 0.4% from other races, and 2.6% from two or more races. Hispanic or Latino of any race were 1.3% of the population.

There were 426 households, of which 29.6% had children under the age of 18 living with them, 48.6% were married couples living together, 10.3% had a female householder with no husband present, 6.6% had a male householder with no wife present, and 34.5% were non-families. 31.2% of all households were made up of individuals, and 18.6% had someone living alone who was 65 years of age or older. The average household size was 2.30 and the average family size was 2.85.

The median age in the city was 40.8 years. 22.9% of residents were under the age of 18; 8.1% were between the ages of 18 and 24; 24.9% were from 25 to 44; 22% were from 45 to 64; and 22.2% were 65 years of age or older. The gender makeup of the city was 48.7% male and 51.3% female.

2000 census
As of the census of 2000, there were 838 people, 365 households, and 248 families living in the city. The racial makeup of the city was 96.42% White, 0.60% African American, 2.27% Native American, and 0.72% from two or more races. Hispanic or Latino of any race were 0.12% of the population. 17.2% were of German, 15.6% Finnish, 15.1% Norwegian, 11.1% Swedish, 6.4% Polish and 5.3% French ancestry.

There were 365 households, out of which 24.9% had children under the age of 18 living with them, 57.0% were married couples living together, 7.7% had a female householder with no husband present, and 31.8% were non-families. 26.8% of all households were made up of individuals, and 15.3% had someone living alone who was 65 years of age or older.  The average household size was 2.30 and the average family size was 2.75.

In the city, the population was spread out, with 21.8% under the age of 18, 5.3% from 18 to 24, 25.7% from 25 to 44, 23.3% from 45 to 64, and 24.0% who were 65 years of age or older.  The median age was 43 years. For every 100 females, there were 90.0 males.  For every 100 females age 18 and over, there were 85.6 males.

The median income for a household in the city was $42,857, and the median income for a family was $46,000. Males had a median income of $36,118 versus $26,313 for females. The per capita income for the city was $19,590.  About 0.8% of families and 3.9% of the population were below the poverty line, including 3.7% of those under age 18 and 3.3% of those age 65 or over.

Politics

Education
It is zoned to Cloquet Public Schools. Cloquet High School is the zoned high school.

References

External links
 City of Scanlon, MN – Official site

Cities in Carlton County, Minnesota
Cities in Minnesota